Thonje is a village in the Himalayas of northern Nepal. It lies on the Marshyangdi River, in the foothills of Manaslu and Annapurna and is often bypassed on the Annapurna Circuit Trek.

References 

Populated places in Manang District, Nepal